The 2019 Boys' Youth Pan-American Volleyball Cup was the third edition of the bi-annual Continental Cup, played by seven countries from April 22–30, 2019 in Santo Domingo, Dominican Republic. Cuba won the tournament beating Mexico in the finals. As Cuba had already qualified for the  U19 World Championship through the NORCECA Championship, Mexico and the Dominican Republic qualified instead. Jose Miguel Gutierrez won the MVP award.

Competing Nations

Preliminary round
All times are in Eastern Standard Time (UTC−04:00)

Group A

Group B

Final round

Championship bracket

Quarterfinals

Semifinals

Seventh place match

Fifth place match

Bronze medal match

Final

Final standing

Miguel Gutierrez,
Christian Thondike,
Adrian Chirino,
Ricardo Gomez,
Yoel Bolaños,
Reynier Ibar,
Alejandro Gonzalez,
Francisco Valle,
Vidal Allen,
Alexei Ramirez,
Ramon Andreu,
Eduardo Hernandez

Individual awards

Most Valuable Player

Best Scorer

Best Setter

Best Server

Best Outside Hitters

Best Middle Blockers

Best Opposite

Best Libero

Best Receiver

Best Digger

References

Men's Pan-American Volleyball Cup
International volleyball competitions hosted by the Dominican Republic
Panamerican Volleyball Cup
Panamerican Volleyball Cup
Panamerican Volleyball Cup